Thisizima is a genus of moths belonging to the family Tineidae.

Species
Thisizima antiphanes Meyrick, 1894
Thisizima bovina Meyrick, 1928
Thisizima bubalopa Meyrick, 1911
Thisizima ceratella Walker, 1864
Thisizima fasciaria Yang, Li & Kendrick, 2012
Thisizima sedilis Meyrick, 1907
Thisizima subceratella Yang, Li & Kendrick, 2012

References

Tineidae
Tineidae genera